Penicillium coalescens is a fungus species of the genus of Penicillium which was isolated from soil.

See also
List of Penicillium species

References

coalescens
Fungi described in 1984